The following is a list of New Zealand women botanists, plant collectors and other notable women who have made contributions to the field of botany. This list is in alphabetical order by surname.



A
Nancy Adams

B
Ellen Wright Blackwell
Shona M. Bell

C
Ella Orr Campbell
Anne Maria Chapman
Beverley Clarkson
Vivienne Cassie Cooper
Lucy Cranwell
Kathleen Maisey Curtis

D
Helen Kirkland Dalrymple
Joan Dingley

E
 Audrey Eagle

F
 Sarah Featon

G
Elsie Mary Griffin

H
Emily Cumming Harris
Elizabeth Herriott
Eliza Amy Hodgson

J
Paula Jameson
Emma Jones

K
 Martha King

M
Ruth Mason
Barbara Mitcalfe
Betty Molesworth Allen (1913–2002)
Lucy Beatrice Moore

N
 Wendy Nelson

O
 Fanny Osborne

S
Rosa Olga Sansom
Elizabeth Stack
Emily Stevens
Greta Stevenson 
Jean Struthers 
Mary Sutherland

T
Grace Marie Taylor

See also
 List of botanists
 List of botanists by author abbreviation

Botany
New Zealand women botanists
Lists of New Zealand women